Elizabeth Cabot Cary Agassiz (pseudonym, Actaea; December 5, 1822 – June 27, 1907) was an American educator, naturalist, writer, and the co-founder and first president of Radcliffe College. A researcher of natural history, she was an author and illustrator of natural history texts as well as a co-author of natural history texts with her husband, Louis Agassiz, and her stepson Alexander Agassiz.

Agassiz accompanied her husband on his journey to Brazil in 1865-6 and on the Hassler expedition in 1871-2; of the second, she wrote an account for the Atlantic Monthly. She published A First Lesson in Natural History (Boston, 1859) and edited Geological Sketches (1866).

Early life and education
Elizabeth Cabot Cary was born on December 5, 1822 into a Boston Brahmin family of New England ancestry. She was born at the house of her grandfather, Thomas Handasyd Perkins, on Pearl Street in Boston, Massachusetts. Her parents were Mary Ann Cushing Perkins Cary and Thomas Graves Cary (who was a graduate of Harvard University in 1811).

The Cary and Perkins families were from England, and came to Massachusetts during the seventeenth century. Elizabeth Cary was the second of five daughters and seven children and was referred to as "Lizzie" by her immediate family and close friends. Because of her fragile health, she was tutored at home in Temple Place, Boston, which included the study of languages, drawing, music, and reading. She additionally received informal history lessons from Elizabeth Peabody.

Career

She traveled with her husband and family to Charleston, South Carolina for his professorship in the medical school throughout the winters of 1851-1852 and 1852–1853. She also visited Europe with him in 1859. She worked closely with her husband in his scientific research. Specifically, she accompanied him as the main writer and record keeper for the Thayer Expedition to Brazil, from April 1865 to August 1866, and the Hassler Expedition through the Strait of Magellan, from December 1871 to August 1872.

In 1856, in their home in Cambridge, Agassiz founded a school for girls from Boston. Her husband supported her by giving courses as well as arranging for courses from other Harvard professors. After the closure of the school in 1863 she helped organize and manage The Thayer Expedition with her husband, who she accompanied to Brazil (1865–1866). This expedition, occurring from 1865–1866, came at the end of the American Civil War, its maiden voyage from New York to Rio de Janeiro beginning in the war's final week. In 1867, she began a correspondence with Arnold Guyot, a geologist and meteorologist. She also helped organize and manage the next expedition (the Hassler Expedition in 1871-1872), which was the first important U.S. government marine exploration, and made transcripts. After her husband's death in 1873, she published several books on natural history for which she had conducted research for many years.

Agassiz contributed to the founding of the coeducational Anderson School of Natural History. She was (from 1869) one of the first women members of the American Philosophical Society (with Mary Fairfax Somerville and Maria Mitchell); she became a member on October 15.

Society for the Private Collegiate Instruction for Women
In 1879, she was one of seven female managing directors of the Society for the Private Collegiate Instruction for Women (Harvard Annex). This provided qualified women who intended to pursue an advancement in their education in Cambridge with the opportunity to have private tuition from professors at Harvard College. Agassiz was essential in ensuring that the "Harvard Annex" for women's education was transformed in 1894 from Harvard University into Radcliffe College. From 1894 to 1900, this college was under their direction and from 1900 to 1903 she was honorary president. With her tact and her fundraising skills she promoted the college and contributed significantly to its continuity.

Agassiz became a member of the Ladies' Visiting Committee for the Kindergarten for the Blind, under the Perkins Institution for the Blind. She acted as treasurer for the Cambridge branch of the committee until an illness in 1904.

Research and published works 

Her research can be studied through her published books in addition to her series of diary entries depicting her global ventures. Her publications include A First Lesson in Natural History (1859) and Seaside Studies in Natural History (1865), in which she was assisted by her stepson, Alexander Emanuel Agassiz. Elizabeth Agassiz originally published A First Lesson under the pseudonym Actaea. Additionally, Elizabeth Agassiz co-authored A Journey in Brazil (1868) and edited and published Louis Agassiz: His Life and Correspondence in 1885. A biography of Elizabeth Cabot Agassiz was later written by her sister, Emma F. Cary, and Lucy Allen Paton, published in the spring of 1917 with the assistance of the Council of Radcliffe College.

Personal life 

Following the marriage of her older sister Mary to Harvard Professor Cornelius Conway Felton (later president of Harvard University), she began socializing with a group of intellectuals in Cambridge, Massachusetts. In 1846, she met scientist Louis Agassiz at a dinner with Mary and her husband. Though they wanted to marry, he still had a wife and three children (Pauline, Ida and Alexander) in Switzerland. His wife died in 1848. In December 1849—when socially acceptable to wed—Lizzie's father gave his blessing. They married on April 25, 1850 in Boston, Massachusetts at King's Chapel. Agassiz organized the household and took care of the finances and the children. She developed strong relationships with her stepchildren, Alexander, Ida, and Pauline, and her grandchildren. She had no children of her own.

After her husband's death in 1873, she continued to devote time to her work and family. She continued to enjoy traveling, and in 1892, Agassiz ventured with family to the Pacific Coast, specifically California, for three months.

She died on June 27, 1907 in Arlington, Massachusetts of a cerebral hemorrhage. She is buried in Mount Auburn Cemetery with her husband. The monument is a boulder selected from the moraine of the Aar Glaciers, near where Agassiz once lived.

Selected works 
 A First Lesson in Natural History (1859)
 Seaside Studies in Natural History (1865)
 A Journey in Brazil (1868)
 Louis Agassiz: His Life and Correspondence, vol. I and vol. II (1885)

References

Citations

Attribution

External links

 Encyclopædia Britannica entry
 
 
Agassiz at Women Philosophers website
Papers, 1884-1959: A Finding Aid. Schlesinger Library, Radcliffe Institute, Harvard University.

1822 births
1907 deaths
American biographers
American naturalists
American women philosophers
Presidents of Radcliffe College
Writers from Boston
Writers from Cambridge, Massachusetts
Burials at Mount Auburn Cemetery
Elizabeth
Members of the American Philosophical Society
Philosophers from Massachusetts
19th-century American philosophers
19th-century American writers
19th-century American women writers
Pseudonymous women writers
Wikipedia articles incorporating text from A Woman of the Century
American women biographers
19th-century pseudonymous writers